Tanbark is the bark of certain species of trees, traditionally used for tanning hides into leather.

The words "tannin", "tanning", "tan," and "tawny" are derived from the Medieval Latin tannare, "to convert into leather."

Bark mills are horse- or oxen-driven or water-powered edge mills and were used in earlier times to shred the tanbark to derive tannins for the leather industry. A "barker" was a person who stripped bark from trees to supply bark mills.

Tanbark around the world

In Europe, oak is a common source of tanbark. Quercitannic acid is the chief constituent found in oak barks. The bark is taken from young branches and twigs in oak coppices and can be up to 4 mm thick; it is grayish-brown on the outside and brownish-red on the inner surface.

In some areas of the United States, such as northern California, "mulch" is often called tanbark, even by manufacturers and distributors. In these areas, the word "mulch" may refer to peat moss or to very fine tanbark. In California, Notholithocarpus densiflorus (commonly known as the tanoak or tanbark-oak) was used.
In America, condensed tannins are also present in the bark of blackjack oak (Quercus marilandica). In New York, on the slopes of Mount Tremper, hemlock bark was a major source of tanbark during the 19th century.

Around the Mediterranean Sea, sumach (Rhus coriaria) leaves and bark are used.

In Africa and Australia, acacia (called "wattle") bark is used by tanners. One ton of wattle or mimosa bark produces about 150 lbs of pure tannin. Used tanbark is employed in horticulture and spread on flower beds and in glass houses to keep down weeds and protect plant roots.

See also
Barkdust

References

External links

Tanning (leather)
Non-timber forest products